This is a list of the main career statistics of professional Taiwanese tennis player Hsieh Su-wei. To date, Hsieh has won 3 singles and 30 doubles career titles, including four Grand Slam doubles titles at the Wimbledon Championships in 2013, 2019, and 2021, as well as at the French Open in 2014. She has also won one WTA Finals doubles title in 2013, twelve WTA 1000 doubles titles. Hsieh has also been a runner–up at the 2020 Australian Open, and a semifinalist at the 2012 US Open. She reached her career-high doubles ranking of world No. 1 on 12 May 2014 and has spent a combined total of 45 weeks with the top ranking.

Performance timelines

Only main-draw results in WTA Tour, Grand Slam tournaments, Fed Cup/Billie Jean King Cup and Olympic Games are included in win–loss records.

Singles
Current after the 2021 Courmayeur.

Doubles

Mixed doubles

Significant finals

Grand Slam tournaments

Doubles: 5 (4 titles, 1 runner-up)

Year-end championships

Doubles: 4 (1 title, 3 runner-ups)

WTA 1000 tournaments

Doubles: 13 (12 titles, 1 runner-up)

WTA career finals

Singles: 3 (3 titles)

Doubles: 45 (30 titles, 15 runner-ups)

WTA 125 tournament finals

Singles: 1 (runner–up)

Doubles: 1 (1 title)

ITF Circuit finals

Singles: 31 (27 titles, 4 runner–ups)

Doubles: 38 (23 titles, 15 runner–ups)

WTA Tour career earnings
Current after the 2022 Melbourne Summer Set 1.

* Hsieh won her first tour title in 2007, so relevant stats begin from there.  Statistics for WTA Prize Money Leaders only includes the Top 100 till 2013.  By utilizing Career Prize Money information, prize money earned from 2001–2007, 2010–2011 is $604,427.

Head-to-head records

Record against top 10 players
Hsieh's record against players who have been ranked in the top 10. Active players are in boldface.

No. 1 wins

Top 10 wins

Notes

References 

Tennis career statistics